The 2019–20 Iran Super League season was the 30th season of the Iranian basketball league.

Regular season

Standings

Results

Playoffs

 The Iranian government postponed the playoffs due to the coronavirus pandemic in Iran. On April 15, 2020, after two months of suspension, the Iranian Basketball Federation officially ended the 2019–20 season, the title was not assigned.

References

 Asia Basket
 Iranian Basketball Federation

Iranian Basketball Super League seasons
Iran
Iranian Basketball Super League